Night Fire is a 1994 American drama and thriller film directed and produced by Mike Sedan. Its music was directed by Miriam Cutler. The film stars Shannon Tweed, John Laughlin, Rochelle Swanson, Martin Hewitt and Alma Beltran in the lead roles.

Cast
 Shannon Tweed
 John Laughlin
 Rochelle Swanson
 Martin Hewitt
 Alma Beltran
 Jeff Fitzpatrick
 Lisa Welch

References

External links
 
 

1994 films
1990s thriller drama films
American thriller drama films
1994 drama films
1990s English-language films
1990s American films